Matías Alejandro Ibáñez Basualdo (born 16 December 1986) is an Argentine footballer who plays for Colón as a goalkeeper.

Club career
Born in Buenos Aires, Ibáñez graduated from local Vélez Sarsfield, but made his senior debuts with neighbouring Olimpo. With the side he achieved promotion back to Primera División in the 2009–10 season, as champions.

On 31 July 2012 Ibáñez moved to San Lorenzo in a season-long loan. Initially as a backup for Pablo Migliore, he managed to appear ten times for Ciclón.

On 11 February 2014 free agent Ibáñez joined Spanish Segunda División side SD Eibar. On 20 June, after making no appearances for the Armeros, he signed a two and a half-year contract with Lanús.

References

External links

1986 births
Living people
Footballers from Buenos Aires
Argentine footballers
Argentine expatriate footballers
Association football goalkeepers
Argentine Primera División players
Primera Nacional players
Olimpo footballers
San Lorenzo de Almagro footballers
SD Eibar footballers
Club Atlético Lanús footballers
Club Atlético Temperley footballers
Club Atlético Patronato footballers
Racing Club de Avellaneda footballers
Club Atlético Colón footballers
Argentine expatriate sportspeople in Spain
Expatriate footballers in Spain